Kevin Holland is a Canadian politician, who was elected to the Legislative Assembly of Ontario in the 2022 provincial election. He represents the riding of Thunder Bay—Atikokan as a member of the Progressive Conservative Party of Ontario.

Holland was previously the mayor of Conmee Township.

References 

Living people
Progressive Conservative Party of Ontario MPPs
21st-century Canadian politicians
People from Thunder Bay District
Mayors of places in Ontario
Year of birth missing (living people)